Rancho Cahuenga was a   Mexican land grant in the San Fernando Valley, in present-day Los Angeles County, California given in 1843  by governor Manuel Micheltorena to José Miguel Triunfo. Rancho Cahuenga is now a part of the city of Burbank, with the Los Angeles River channel running through it. Rancho Cahuenga is often confused with the nearby Campo de Cahuenga, near what is now Universal City, where in 1847 the Articles of Capitulation were signed, ending the Mexican-American War in Alta California.

History
Jose Miguel Triunfo was an ex-San Fernando Mission Indian born around 1810. He had been granted Rancho Cahuenga by Mexican Governor Micheltorena in 1843 for services performed at the Mission.  Jose Miguel Triunfo was one of the few Indians that were able to obtain and keep property.  Miguel and his wife, Maria Rafaela (Canedo) Arriola can be found in the 1850 census of Los Angeles.
 
In 1845, Triunfo traded the  Rancho Cahuenga for the  Rancho Tujunga owned brothers Pedro Lopez and Francisco Lopez.  
  
With the cession of California to the United States following the Mexican-American War, the 1848 Treaty of Guadalupe Hidalgo provided that the land grants would be honored.  As required by the Land Act of 1851, a claim for Rancho Cahuenga was filed with the Public Land Commission in 1852, and the Rancho Cahuenga grant was patented to David W. Alexander and Francis Mellus in 1872.

Rancho Cahuenga was an inholding within the Rancho Providencia land grant.  In 1867, Alexander sold Rancho Cahuenga to David Burbank, who had also acquired Rancho Providencia.

See also
Cahuenga, California; Tongva settlement.
Ranchos of California
List of Ranchos of California

References

External links
Map of old Spanish and Mexican ranchos in Los Angeles County

 

Cahuenga
Cahuenga
History of the San Fernando Valley
History of Los Angeles
Cahuenga
Burbank, California
Toluca Lake, Los Angeles
Universal City, California